This is a list of football teams in Botswana.
For a complete list see :Category:Football clubs in Botswana

B
Black Forest FC
Botswana Defence Force XI FC
Botswana Railways Highlanders

E
ECCO City Green
Extension Gunners
Eleven angels

G
Great North Tigers F.C.
Gaborone United

M
Miscellaneous F.C.
Mochudi Centre Chiefs SC
Motlakase Power Dynamos

N
Nico United
Notwane

O
Orapa United FC

P
Pajomo FC
Palapye All Stars FC
Palapye United
Pilikwe United
Police XI
Prisons XI

S
Satmos
Sankoyo Bush Bucks
Security Systems F.C.
Shooting Stars

T
TAFIC
TASC FC
Township Rollers

U
Uniao Flamengo Santos F.C.

W
Wonder Sporting Club

Notes

External links
RSSSF page for Botswana Premier league
 Unofficial Botswana Soccer Page

 
Botswana
Football clubs in Botswana
Football clubs